KRQT (107.1 FM, "Rocket 107 Classic Rock") is a radio station broadcasting a classic rock music format. Licensed to Castle Rock, Washington, United States, the station is currently owned by Bicoastal Media Licenses IV, LLC and features programming from Citadel Media.

References

External links

RQT
Classic rock radio stations in the United States
Radio stations established in 1977